Alexander Marshall (31 October 1820 – 28 September 1871) was an English first-class cricketer active 1849–60 who played for Surrey. He was born and died in Godalming. He played in 26 first-class matches.

References

1820 births
1871 deaths
English cricketers
Surrey cricketers
Marylebone Cricket Club cricketers
Non-international England cricketers
Surrey Club cricketers
Gentlemen of the South cricketers
People from Godalming